This is a list of islands of the Republic of  Macedonia. Since the country is landlocked, all its islands are situated in lakes or rivers.

Lake islands

Debar Lake 
 Greater Debar Island and Lesser Debar Island

Kalimanci Lake 
 Kalata (peninsula in summer)

Prespa Lake 
 Golem Grad (Snake Island)

Tikveš Lake 
 Gradište
 unnamed island in around off the coast at Brušani (Kavadarci Municipality)
 unnamed island in around off the coast of Dradnja (Kavadarci Municipality)
 unnamed island near the place when the lake branches off and continues into Blaštica River.()

River islands 
River islands are found mainly in course of the Vardar that stretches from the central to the southern part of the country. Of special note are those found in Valandovo Municipality. .

 Janitaš, Veles
 Adata

References 

North Macedonia, Republic of
 
Islands